Zygophylax pinnata is a species of cnidaria in the family Zygophylacidae. The species is carnivorous. Individuals can get up to 270 µm. They also reproduce asexually.

The species occurs in northern parts of the Atlantic Ocean, the western parts of Indian Ocean, and the Arctic Ocean. In the Barents Sea the species occurs in the bathyal zone in low temperatures.

References 

Cnidarians of the Atlantic Ocean
Cnidarians of the Indian Ocean